The women's 4 × 100 metre medley relay event at the 2012 Summer Olympics took place on 3–4 August at the London Aquatics Centre in London, United Kingdom.

The U.S. women's team solidified their triumph to demolish a new world record and to recapture their Olympic title after twelve years. Leading from the start, the fearsome foursome of Missy Franklin (58.50), Rebecca Soni (1:04.82), Dana Vollmer (55.48), and Allison Schmitt (53.25) put together a perfect ending with a stunning gold-medal time in 3:52.05 to shave off China's global standard by 14-hundredths of a second from the 2009 World Championships at the peak of the high-tech bodysuit era.

Australia's Emily Seebohm (59.01), Leisel Jones (1:06.06), Alicia Coutts (56.41), and Melanie Schlanger (52.54) trailed behind their formidable rivals by a couple of seconds, but managed to take home a magnificent silver in 3:54.02. Pulling off a second-place finish, Jones also matched Ian Thorpe for the most medals by an Australian swimmer in her fourth straight Olympics with a remarkable overall tally of nine (three golds, five silver, and one bronze).

Japan's Aya Terakawa (58.99), Satomi Suzuki (1:05.96), Yuka Kato (57.36), and Haruka Ueda (53.42) ended on a spectacular fashion with a bronze medal in 3:55.73, holding off the robust Russian quartet of Anastasia Zuyeva (59.13), Yuliya Yefimova (1:04.98), Irina Bespalova (58.59), and Veronika Popova (53.33) by exactly three-tenths of a second (0.30), a fourth-place time in 3:56.03.

Outside the podium, China's Zhao Jing (59.86), Ji Liping (1:06.94), Lu Ying (56.80), and Tang Yi (52.81) could not produce a similar stellar performance in the medley relay with a fifth-place finish in 3:56.41, while the Dutch foursome of Sharon van Rouwendaal (1:00.72), Moniek Nijhuis (1:06.74), Inge Dekker (56.91), and star Ranomi Kromowidjojo (52.91), who captured another sprint freestyle title an hour earlier, claimed a distant sixth spot in 3:57.28. Denmark (3:57.76) and Great Britain (3:59.46) rounded out the championship finale.

Records
Prior to this competition, the existing world and Olympic records were as follows.

The following records were established during the competition:

Results

Heats

Final

References

External links
NBC Olympics Coverage

Women's 4 x 100 metre medley relay
4 × 100 metre medley relay
2012 in women's swimming
Women's events at the 2012 Summer Olympics